Comdata is a payment processor and issuer of fleet fuel cards, corporate spend cards, paperless payroll cards ("paycards"), virtual payments, and trucking permits.

History
Comdata was founded in 1969 by Curtiss W. Harter Jr. It began in the trucking industry, but current customers cover most major industries in the United States, including retail, hospitality, restaurants, construction, government, healthcare, and education.

Corporate cards can be used to manage any purchases that a company makes. Comdata's expense management system allows administrators to set limits on cards restricting usage to certain merchants, dollar amounts, and number of transactions.

Virtual payments are claimed to be secure and easy to administer, and reduce the risk of an unauthorized user compromising card information. They also reduce the number of checks a purchasing department has to process for vendors.

Comdata was a subsidiary of Ceridian but has since been acquired by Fleetcor for $3.45 billion in December 2014, and is headquartered in Brentwood, Tennessee.

References

External links

Ceridian
Companies based in Tennessee
Williamson County, Tennessee
American companies established in 1969
Financial technology companies
2014 mergers and acquisitions